Dead Pigs (literally "floating city on the sea") is a 2018 comedy drama film written and directed by Cathy Yan in her directorial feature film debut. It stars Vivian Wu, Haoyu Yang, Mason Lee, Meng Li, and David Rysdahl. The film had its world premiere in the World Cinema Dramatic Competition section at the 2018 Sundance Film Festival on January 19, 2018. It was released worldwide on February 12, 2021 on Mubi.

Synopsis
A bumbling pig farmer, a feisty salon owner, a sensitive busboy, an ambitious expat architect and a disenchanted rich girl converge and collide as thousands of dead pigs float down the river towards a rapidly modernizing Shanghai, China.

Cast
 Vivian Wu as Candy Wang
 Haoyu Yang as Old Wang
 Mason Lee as Wang Zhen
 Meng Li as Xia Xia
 David Rysdahl as Sean Landry
 Zazie Beetz as Angie
 Archibald C. McColl IV as Phil Johnson

Production
The film was written and directed by Cathy Yan. It was inspired by the 2013 Huangpu River dead pigs incident. Yan said, "I was born close to Shanghai, and I used to be a reporter, so it just felt like the story I had to tell." The film was shot by Federico Cesca. Filming took place in Shanghai.

Release
The film had its world premiere in the World Cinema Dramatic Competition section at the 2018 Sundance Film Festival on January 19, 2018. It was released in China on January 25, 2019. The film was released worldwide on February 12, 2021 by Mubi.

Reception

Critical reception
Its site consensus reads, "Dead Pigs casts a sharp critical and satirical eye toward late-stage capitalism in China and the world beyond, establishing writer-director Cathy Yan as a filmmaker to watch." On Metacritic, the film has a weighted average score of 72 out of 100 based on 9 reviews.

Justin Lowe of The Hollywood Reporter described the film as "a dark, quirky comedy that peels back the layers of contemporary Mainland mores and reveals a group of people almost completely deracinated by their quest to get ahead in a society buffeted by rapidly shifting cultural expectations." Jessica Kiang of Variety wrote, "Yan's film, with its dancing girls, pigeon-fancying beauticians, Westerners-on-the-make and spontaneous musical numbers, is an antidote to China's weightier arthouse output, settling the stomach after too much stolid social realism, effervescent as an alka-seltzer." Elizabeth Horkley of Mubi praised the verisimilitude of Yan's cast of characters, writing: "Dead Pigs, in its favoring of ordinary, human interactions over narrative pomp, leads to unexpected places that shouldn't be unexpected at all. Her characters behave like multifaceted humans, and the pleasure in watching Yan’s debut feature is akin to the feeling of meeting someone new who you think you're going to like."

Accolades

References

External links
 

2018 films
Chinese-language films
English-language Chinese films
Shanghainese-language films
Films directed by Cathy Yan
2018 multilingual films
Chinese multilingual films
American multilingual films
2010s English-language films